Atrapada (Trapped) is a Mexican telenovela produced by Ernesto Alonso for Televisa in 1991.

Christian Bach and Héctor Bonilla starred as protagonists, while Guillermo Capetillo and Raquel Olmedo starred as antagonists.

Plot 
It all begins at the end of the year party given by the millionaire Montero family. Antonio Montero, president of the Montermex companies, is found dead supposedly due to a suicide, but Camila, Antonio's daughter, is convinced that her father was murdered to remove him from the path and control of the companies.

This is how suspicions and intrigues begin. They are all suspects, including the men Camila has loved: René Pizarro, her first boyfriend; Ángel Montero, with whom she also fell in love with her; and Gonzalo Rodríguez, with whom she ended up marrying, without love. No one learned of the latter's presence at the party until one of the employees claimed to have seen him that night at the Montero home.

But little by little more deaths will occur that will cause Camila to be trapped in a vortex of pain, anguish and suspense. Could the murderer be one of Camila's loves? Will he want to kill her too, since she has decided to find out who killed her father at all costs?

Cast 
  
 Christian Bach as Camila Montero
 Héctor Bonilla as Gonzalo Rodríguez
 Guillermo Capetillo as Ángel Montero
 Alma Muriel as Luisa
 Frank Moro as Jaime
 Guillermo García Cantú as Víctor Montero
 Gerardo Murguía as René Pizarro
 Margarita Gralia as Adela
 Rosario Gálvez as Tomasa
 Ernesto Godoy as Raúl
 Marisol Santacruz as Sonia Montero
 Rodrigo Vidal as Luis
 Sofía Álvarez as Alicia Montero
 Roberto Antúnez as Claudio López Naranjo
 Julieta Egurrola as Fina Montero
 Raquel Olmedo as Marcia Montero
 Macaria as Rita
 Raul Román as David
 Mario Casillas as Aníbal Montero
 Armando Araiza as Fernando
 Lucero Lander as Elisa Pizarro
 Carlos Cardán as Manuel
 Dunia Saldívar as Lola
 Alicia Fahr as Nina
 Marichelo as Mimí
 Arturo Beristáin as Eduardo
 Jerardo as Efraín
 Miguel Suárez as Don Fernando
 Gerardo Vigil as Ledezma
 Lucero Rojas as Daniela
 Jorge Fegan as Dr. Salas
 David Rencoret as Dr. Orozco
 María Rebeca as Gloria
 Mauricio Ferrari as Antonio Montero
 Alejandro Ruiz as Octavio
 Ofelia D'Rosas as Verónica
 Leandro Martínez as Don Paco
 Evangelina Sosa as Lupita
 Rosita Quintana as Jane Solís
 Felio Heliel as Dr. Wilfredo Salas

References

External links

1991 telenovelas
Mexican telenovelas
1991 Mexican television series debuts
1992 Mexican television series endings
Spanish-language telenovelas
Television shows set in Mexico City
Televisa telenovelas